Calathus glabricollis is a species of ground beetle from the Platyninae subfamily that can be found in Bulgaria, Greece, Italy and all states of former Yugoslavia.

References

glabricollis
Beetles described in 1828
Beetles of Europe